David George Charles Harper is the senior lecturer in Evolutionary Biology in the School of Life Sciences at the University of Sussex, England.  He specifically lectures Animal Diversity, Darwinian Evolution, Cooperation & Conflict in Animal Societies, Conservation in Practice and Applied systematics.

Harper was born in Sutton Coldfield, Birmingham.  He earned his doctorate at the University of Cambridge and was a Junior Research Fellow at St John's College, Oxford.  In addition to lecturing, he researches the behavioural ecology of passerine birds, especially Robins.

Publications
For full list of publications click here

 Maynard Smith, J. & Harper, D.G.C. (2003) Animal Signals. Oxford University Press, Oxford. 
 Brickle, N.W. & Harper, D.G.C. (2002). Agricultural intensification and the timing of breeding of Corn Buntings Miliaria calandra. Bird Study 49: 219-236.
 Thomas, R.J., Szekely, T, Cuthill, I.C., Harper, D.G.C., Newson, S.E., Frayling, T.D., & Wallis, P.D. (2002) Eye size in birds and the timing of song at dawn. Proceedings of the Royal Society, B. 269: 831-837.
 Brickle, N.W. & Harper, D.G.C. (2000) Habitat use by Corn Buntings Miliaria calandra in winter and summer. In Aebischer, N.J., Evans, A.D., Grice, P.V. & Vickery, J.A. (eds) Ecology and Conservation of Lowland Farmland Birds: 156-164. Tring: British Ornithologists' Union.
 Gosler, A.G. & Harper, D.G.C. (2000) Assessing the heritability of body condition in birds: a challenge exemplified by the Great Tit Parus major L. (Aves). Biological Journal of the Linnean Society 71: 103-117.
 Brickle, N.W., Harper, D.G.C., Aebischer, N.J. & Cockayne, S.J. (2000) Effects of agricultural intensification on the breeding success of corn buntings Miliaria calandra. Journal of Applied Ecology 37: 742-755.

External links
Dr David Harper at University of Sussex

English biologists
Academics of the University of Sussex
Alumni of the University of Cambridge
Year of birth missing (living people)
Living people